Hyun Hee (born October 4, 1976 in Seongnam, Gyeonggi-do, South Korea) is a retired South Korean épée fencer.

At the 2002 FIE World Championships Hyun won the women's individual épée final match over Imke Duplitzer of Germany 15–11. She, along with Chinese fencer Tan Xue were the first Asian fencers to win gold medals at the World Championships. In that year, Hyun was named South Korean Sportswoman of the Year.

Achievements
 2002 World Fencing Championships, Individual épée

References

1976 births
Living people
South Korean female épée fencers
Asian Games medalists in fencing
Fencers at the 2002 Asian Games
Korea National Sport University alumni
People from Seongnam
Asian Games gold medalists for South Korea
Asian Games silver medalists for South Korea
Medalists at the 2002 Asian Games
Sportspeople from Gyeonggi Province
21st-century South Korean women